Fraser Island is a locality on the island of Fraser Island in the Fraser Coast Region, Queensland, Australia. It consists of most but not all of the land on the island. In the  the locality of Fraser Island (and not the island as a whole) had a population of 182 people.

Geography 

The island (which is also known as K'gari and Gari) is divided into two localities: this (Fraser Island) locality consisting of most of the land and the locality of Eurong on the east coast of the island.

Happy Valley is the only town in the locality, located on the east coast of the locality, north of Eurong.

Almost all of the locality is within the Great Sandy National Park except for isolated pockets of development at Orchid Beach, Maheno Beach, Happy Valley, Dilli Village, Kingfisher Bay Resort and near Moon Point.

Mountains and valleys 

The locality has the following mountains, sand dunes, and valleys:

 Anvilstone Sand Blow, a dune, named for the specimens of stones that were used in the preparation of Aboriginal food
Badjala Sand Blow, a dune, named for the Aboriginal clan which occupied the central section of the island
Ban'ga Sand Blow, a dune, named using the Badtjala language word meaning Zamia
Ba'pun Sand Blow, a dune, named using the Badtjala language word meaning moon
Bare Hill 
Beemeer Sand Blow, a dune
Beerall Sand Blow, a dune, named using the Butchulla language, meaning God of the Butchulla People
 Bimjella Hill
Binngih Sand Blow, a dune, named using the Badtjala language name for Waddy Point
Birre Sand Blow, a dune, named using the Butchulla language word meaning hand
 Boomanjin Hill, formerly Mount Boemingen 
 Burrgum Hill, formerly Boomerang Hill 
Buwan Sand Blow, a dune, named using the Butchulla language word meaning sleepy
Carree Sand Blow, a dune, named using the Badtjala language for the Sandy Cape area
Carroor Sand Blow, a dune
Dhu'lar Hill, named using the Badtjala language meaning blackbutt tree
Di'bing Sand Blow, a dune, named using the Badtjala language meaning mosquito

 Diray Sand Blow, a dune, named using the Butchulla language meaning star
 Duling Sand Blow, a dune, named using the Badtjala language meaning shell necklace or shell for making ornaments
 Dulingbara Sand Blow, a dune, named for the Aboriginal clan which occupied the southern section of Fraser Island and part of the Cooloola Coast, meaning people of the nautilus shell ornament

 Flinders Sand Blow, a dune, named as the landing site of Matthew Flinders in 1802
 Ganay Sand Blow, a dune, named using the Butchulla language, meaning long heavy spear made from split hardwood
 Gandus Sand Blow, a dune, named using the Badtjala language, meaning children
 Gira Sand Blow, a dune, named using the Butchulla language, meaning fire
 Guluri Sand Blow, a dune, named using the Butchulla language, meaning canoe
 Gumari Sand Blow,a dune, named using the Butchulla language, meaning shield
 Hammerstone Sand Blow, a dune, named after specimens of the Aboriginal hammerstones discovered on Fraser Island

 Jun Jaree Sand Blow, a dune, named using the Butchulla language, meaning fairy or pixie
 Kirrar Sand Blow, a dune, named using the Badtjala language word Kir'a, meaning fire
 Knifeblade Sand Blow, a dune, named for the specimens of small Aboriginal tools found there
 Koorooman Sand Blow, a dune, named using the Badtjala language, meaning kangaroo
 Kooroy Sand Blow, a dune, named using the Badtjala language, meaning opossum

 Leading Hill 
Markwells Spur, a ridge
Marong Ridge, a ridge, formerly Mount Marong
Milung Sand Blow, a dune, named using the Butchulla language word, meaning evil spirit
Ngiya Sand Blow, a dune, named using the Badtjala language word, meaning sand
Ngulungbara Sand Blow, a dune, named after an Aboriginal clan which occupied the northern section of the island
 Nulwarr Hill 
 Pine Hill
Quartztool Sand Blow, a dune, named after the specimens of Aboriginal tools made from quartz pebbles found there
 Poyungan Hill
 Station Hill

 Poyungan Valley
 Rainbow Gorge
Stonetool Sand Blow, a dune, named after the specimens of the most complete undisturbed Aboriginal campsite found there
The Bluff, a mountain 

 Tuk'ka Sand Blow, a dune, named using the Badtjala language word, meaning grass tree

 Tukkee Sand Blow, a dune, named using the Badtjala language name for Indian Head
 Waddy, a hill
 Warbu Sand Blow, a dune,named using the Badtjala language word, meaning frog
 Winnam Sand Blow, a dune, named using the Butchulla language word, meaning breadfruit
 Wul'lan Sand Blow, a dune, named using the Badtjala language word, meaning pretty-faced wallaby
 Wungai Sand Blow, a dune, named using the Badtjala language word, meaning carpet snake

 Wun'gul Sand Blow, a dune, named using the Badtjala language word, meaning swamp oak tree

 Wurgu Sand Blow, a dune, named using the Butchulla language word, meaning east wind.

 Yurru Sand Blow, a dune, named using the Butchulla language word, meaning fishline, string, or rope

Coastal features 
The locality has the following capes, points, and beaches along its coast:

 Arch Cliff
Blackfellow Point
 Boonlye Point
 Coongul Point
Corroboree Beach
 Elbow Point
 Hook Point, also known as Torerr in the Badtjala language
 Indian Head, named on 20 May 1770 by Lieutenant James Cook of the HM Bark Endeavour because he described it as "...on which a number of Natives were assembled...", also known as Tukkee in the Badtjala language meaning stone or stone knife
Maheno Beach, which extends from Eli Creek to The Pinnacles and takes its name from the wreck of the SS Maheno
Manann Beach, the name derives from the Kabi language meaning carrying water
 Moon Point
North White Cliffs
Orchid Beach, which extends from South Ngkala Rocks to Waddy Point
 Rooney Point
 Sandy Cape, also known as Woakoh, named for its physical appearance on 20 May 1770 by Lieutenant James Cook of the HM Bark Endeavour
 Sandy Point
Seventy Five Mile Beach
South White Cliffs
Triangle Cliff
 Waddy Point, also known as Minker
Yathon Cliffs

Creeks and lakes 
There are many creeks and lakes within the locality:

 Akuna Creek
 Aldridge Creek
 Allom Lake
 Awinya Creek, the name believed to derive from the Kabi language meaning crossing place
 Basin Lake
 Beeliwa Lagoon, the name refers to the casuarina tree in the Kabi language
 Bennet Creek
 Biddierr Creek, the name is from the Kabi language meaning crab hole.
 Black Creek
 Black Lagoon
 Blowah Lakes
 Boolla Lagoons, the name is from the Kabi language word for two.
 Boomerang Lakes
 Boon Boon Creek, formerly Bun Bun Creek, the name is from the Kabi language meaning call of the swamp pheasant
 Bowal Creek
 Bowarrady Creek
 Bridge Creek
 Calarga Lagoon, named for the Kabi language word for sparrow hawk
 Coolooloi Creek, the name derived from the Kabi language word kululu meaning cypress pine (Callitris columellaris)
 Coomboo Lakes
 Coonangoor Creek, the name being the Kabi word for human excreta
 Coondagarramine Creek i(), the name being a Kabi language word in the Badjala dialect meaning shallow water or little water.
 Coongul Creek i(), believe to be a Kabi language word in the Ngulungbara dialect meaning salt water
 Coonoagarramine Creek
 Coorong Creek, the name referring to the Moreton Bay Pine (Araucaria cunninghamii)
 Cubbih Creek, believed to derive from the Kabi language word for honey.
 Cypress Creek
 Deep Creek, also known as Dilgarring Creek, the name Dilgarring is believed to be the Kabi language word for the Acacia (wattle) tree
 Deepwater Lake
 Dibing Swamp, the name is derived from the Badtjala language, referring to the white flowered tea-tree, variant "Di'bing"
 Duck Creek
 Dundonga Creek, formerly Dungonga Creek
 Dundubara Creek, the name being a Kabi language word meaning flies.
 Eli Creek
 Figtree Lake, also known as Lake Goomboor, the name Goomboor being the Kabi language word for bald head
 Freshwater Lakes
 Geewan Creek
 Gerowweea Creek, formerly known as First Creek, the name derived from Kabi language words meaning flying fox (a type of fruit bat)
 Goochee Lagoon i(), the name deriving from a Kabi language word meaning sand goanna
 Govi Creek, formerly Second Creek, the name deriving from the Kabi language word meaning native bee and honey.
 Happy Valley Creek
 Hidden Lake
 Jabiru Swamp
 Kurrnung Creek
 Lake Barga, the name believed to derive from Kabi language words meaning come on.
 Lake Benaroon, the name believed to be derive from tge Kabi language word meaning tight.
 Lake Birrabeen
 Lake Boomanjin, formerly Lake Boemingen
 Lake Bowarrady
 Lake Carree
 Lake Garawongera
 Lake Garry

 Lake Geeoong, the name derived from the Kabi language word meaning white cockatoo
 Lake Gnarann, the name derived from the Kabi language words meaning cracked bark
 Lake Jennings
 Lake Marong
 Lake McKenzie, also known as Boorangoora
 Lake Minker, the name derived from the Kabi language word meaning forest box tree
 Lake Wabby
 Lake Wanhar
 Lake White
 Lake Woonjeel, the name believed to derive from the Kabi language words meaning dark water or darkness.
 Lake Yeenan
 Manoolcoong Lakes, the name believed to derive from the Kabi language words meaning death adder.
 Meereenyoor Creek
 Moondoora Lagoon, the name believed to derive from the Kabi language word meaning red ant
 Ngarr Lagoon, the name derived from the Kabi language word meaning white ant
 Ocean Lake
 Panama Creek
 Poyungan Creek, the name believed to derive from the Kabi language word for tree grub

 Red Lagoon, also known as Walameboulha
 Running Creek
 Salt Creek
 Semaphore Creek
 Sheep Station Lagoons
 Taleerba Creek, formerly Third Creek, the name is believed to derive from the Kabi language word meaning small vine
 Tenimby Creek.
 Thow-wool Lagoon, the named believed to derive from the Kabi language words meaning alone, solitary. or lonely
 Tooloora Creek, formerly known as Fourth Creek, reportedly derived from Kabi language word meaning louse.
 Tootawwah Creek, the name believed to derive from the Kabi language word for small nut
 Towoi Creek, the name believed to be derive from the Kabi language word meaning sardine
 Towoi Swamp, the name also meaning sardine
 Ungowa Creek
 Urang Creek
 Urow-Wa Lakes, the name believed to derive from the Kabi language meaning tea tree.
 Wang-ann Lagoon, the name believed to derive from the Kabi language meaning carpet snake
 Wathumba Creek, the name believed to derive from the Kabi language meaning place of the dead
 Wathumba Swamp
 Wocco Lagoon, the name believed to derive from the Kabi language word meaning mopoke.
 Woocoonba Lagoons.
 Woralie Creek
 Wyuna Creek
 Yankee Jack Creek, also known as Tumbowah Creek
 Yankee Jack Lake
 Yeenyargoor Creek, the name believed to derive from the Kabi language meaning edible vine
 Yeerall Creek, the name believed to derive from the Kabi language meaning small fish
 Yidney Creek, the name believed to derive from the Kabi language in the Badjala dialect meaning mystical or god figure
 Yidney Lake
 Yindeering Lakes, the name believed to derive from the Kabi language meaning kingfisher

Offshore 
There are a number of offshore features near the locality:

 Curtis Channel, commencesto the north-north-west of the locality of Fraser Island extending as far north as The Keppels in Livingstone Shire
 Hervey Bay to the north-west of the locality
 Marloo Bay 
 Platypus Bay

 Poyungan Rocks, name derived from the Kabi language word for tree grub.
 Teahwan Rocks
Wide Bay Harbour.
 Yidney Rocks, name derived from the Kabi language in the Badjala dialect, meaning a mystical or god figure

Other named areas 

There are many named areas with the locality:

 Central Forest Station

 Dilli Village

 Dipuying
 Dundubara, at the mouth of Dundubara Creek

 Enchanted Valley

 Fourways, at the major road intersection at the head of Wanggoolba Creek

 Nulla Kunggur Sand Blow

 Orchid Beach

 Pile Valley

 Pine Valley

 Poyungan Rocks

 Teahwan

 The Cathedrals, the area from Wyuna Creek to Eli Creek

 The Declivity

 The Pinnacles

 Ungowa

 Valley of the Giants, also known as Ti, the area of giant tallow wood trees

 Wathumba

History 
Sandy Cape Provisional School opened circa 1874 and closed circa 1915.

Wungoolba State School opened in 1920 and closed circa 1921.

North White Cliffs State School opened on 1921 and closed in 1925.

Fraser Island Provisional School opened on 13 July 1937 and closed in 1941.

In the  the locality of Fraser Island (not the island as a whole) had a population of 182 people.

Facilities 
Orchid Beach SES Facility is adjacent to the airstrip and heliport.

Happy Valley Ambulance Station is an operational ambulance station.

Happy Valley SES Facility is in Yidney Drive.

Fraser Island Police Station is immediately north of the locality of Eurong but within the location of Fraser Island.

The University of the Sunshine Coast operates the K'gari-Fraser Island Research and Learning Centre at Dilli Village.

Attractions 

Sandy Cape Lighthouse is a heritage-listed active lighthouse. It is close to the northern tip of the island.

Simpson Reef is a  artificial reef in the Great Sandy Marine Park..

The Cathedrals are coloured sand cliffs that have been carved by the wind and rain blowing off the Coral Sea.

The Champagne Pools are a series of natural rock pools that form shallow, sandy swimming holes next to the ocean. They are located on 75 Mile Beach, between Waddy Point and Indian Head.

There are a number of lookouts:

 Markwells Lookout
 Lake Wabby Lookout
 Stonetool Sandblow Lookout()
 Knifeblade Sandblow Lookout
 Lake Allom Viewing Platform

Transport 
There are a number of airstrips and heliports within the locality:

 Boomanjin Airstrip, also known as Toby's Gap airstrip
 Pailba Airstrip
 Orchid Beach airstrip
 unnamed airstrip
 unnamed airstrip
 Orchid Beach Resort heliport
 Eurong heliport
 Happy Valley heliport
 Kingfisher Resort heliport

References

External links 

 

Fraser Coast Region
Localities in Queensland
Fraser Island